As was the custom since 1930, the 1951 Tour de France was contested by national and regional teams. The three major cycling countries in 1951, Italy, Belgium and France, each sent a team of 12 cyclists. Other countries sent teams of 8 cyclists: Switzerland, Luxembourg, Netherlands and Spain. The French regional cyclists were divided into four teams of 12 cyclists: Paris, Ile de France–North West, East–South East and West–South West. The last team of eight cyclists was made up out of cyclists from the French North African colonies. In the end, Luxembourg only sent 7 cyclists, so altogether this made 123 cyclists.

There were 68 French cyclists (of which 1 French-Moroccan and 7 French-Algerian), 12 Italian, 12 Belgian, 8 Dutch, 8 Spanish, 8 Swiss and 7 Luxembourgian cyclists.

Start list

By team

By rider

By nationality

References

1951 Tour de France
1951